Bosques Templados LLuviosos de los Andes Australes (Temperate Rain forests of the Austral Andes) is a Biosphere Reserve in southern Chile. It was declared a Biosphere Reserve by UNESCO in 2007. The reserve protects a large portion of the Valdivian temperate rain forest ecoregion. At least three tree species found in the reserve are listed by CITES as threatened, namely Fitzroya cupressoides, Araucaria araucana and Pilgerodendron uviferum.

The reserve comprises the following protected areas:
Villarrica National Park (Partially)
Puyehue National Park
Vicente Pérez Rosales National Park
Alerce Andino National Park
Hornopirén National Park
Mocho-Choshuenco National Reserve
Llanquihue National Reserve
Futaleufú National Reserve

References

Biosphere reserves of Chile
Valdivian temperate rainforest